Goa is a small Indian state in western India bordering Maharashtra and Karnataka. Presently, Goa has only one operational airport in the state's South Goa district, the Dabolim Airport. A new Greenfield international airport has been built at Mopa, North Goa. The first phase of the airport has been inaugurated on 11th December 2022.

The Dabolim Airport is an international airport which was built in 1955 and is currently owned by the Government of Goa and the Indian Navy. A new terminal at the Dabolim Airport was inaugurated in 2013. The current airport has regular and charter flights to the a few Middle Eastern countries, Russia, and the United Kingdom.

However, due to the Dabolim Airport being a civilian as well as a military airport, airside congestion was a significant problem as the airport has only one runway. Therefore, a new airport at Mopa was proposed. The foundation stone for the new Mopa Airport was laid by Prime Minister Narendra Modi in November 2016. The new Mopa Airport, to be operated by the GMR Group will be built in an area of 2,133 acres (863 ha) at a cost of approximately ₹2,650 crores (US$330 million).

On 11th December 2022, The Mopa Airport has been inaugurated by Prime Minister Narendra Modi and christened as “Manohar International Airport” named after Goa’s late Chief Minister Manohar Parrikar. Flight operations will commence from 5th January 2023.

List
The list includes the airports in the Indian state of Goa with their respective ICAO and IATA codes.

References

Goa
Buildings and structures in Goa